The 1987 Tirreno–Adriatico was the 22nd edition of the Tirreno–Adriatico cycle race and was held from 12 March to 18 March 1987. The race started in Latina and finished in San Benedetto del Tronto. The race was won by Rolf Sørensen of the Remac–Fanini team.

General classification

References

1987
1987 in Italian sport
1987 Super Prestige Pernod International